Mel (Melvin H.) Pekarsky (born September 18, 1934 in Chicago, Illinois) is an American artist and art educator.  He is best known for his paintings and drawings of the desert, and is recognized by art critic Donald Kuspit as "one of the most significant contemporary landscape artists." A professor of art at the State University of New York at Stony Brook for forty years, Pekarsky's work has been shown by the Whitney Museum of American Art, The Fogg Museum of Art at Harvard University, the Cleveland Museum of Art, and the Butler Institute of American Art, among many other venues.

Education and early years

The son of Inda Levin and Abe Pekarsky, who owned a haberdashery, he attended public school in Gary, Indiana. While in high school, he studied weekends at the Saturday School of the Art Institute of Chicago, where he began his undergraduate studies in 1951, transferring the following year to Northwestern University, where he received his B.A. in Studio Art in 1955. He completed his M.A. in Art History there in 1956, writing his thesis on The Drawings of Jean-Francois Millet, while teaching studio art at Northwestern's Chicago campus.

Pekarsky moved to New York City in 1956, joining the staff of the Solomon R. Guggenheim Museum, then under the directorship of James Johnson Sweeney.  He also began PhD studies at New York University's Institute of Fine Arts in the fall of 1956, but was soon called up to military service, serving in the US Army Combat Engineers. During this period he spent time training in Texas mesa country, his "first face-to-face meeting with the southwest desert."

Academic career

Returning to Chicago after military service, he was asked to start the Art Department at Kendall College in Evanston, IL.  During this period (1960–1967), Pekarsky showed with the Devorah Sheman and John L. Hunt Galleries, with "Artists of Chicago and Vicinity" at the Art Institute of Chicago, among other venues, and in Exhibition Momentum, from which work was selected by the US Information Agency to travel in an exhibition of American art in France and Germany. During this period he also worked as an illustrator, and produced a number of children's books (The Curious Cow, The Little Red Hen, and others) before returning to New York in the fall of 1967, accepting an appointment as assistant dean at the School of Visual Arts.  After serving there as assistant and then associate dean, Pekarsky spent the 1970–71 academic year as visiting graduate faculty at New York University, moving in 1973 to a visiting artist position at the State University of New York at Stony Brook.

He was appointed associate professor in 1974, and in 1976 became studio programs coordinator (in which position he would remain until 2004), re-writing the department's B.A. in Studio Art.  Promoted to Professor in 1984, he began a five-year tenure as chair of the Department of Art, writing and implementing the MFA program in Studio Art, which he directed from 1989 until 2003.  Also in that year, Pekarsky chaired a College Art Association panel on "The Idea of the Moral Imperative in Contemporary Art," discussed in Judith Seigel's Mutiny and the Mainstream: Talk That Changed Art, 1975–1990.   A transcript of this panel was published in Art Criticism in 1991. A second term as chair of the Department followed from 2005 to 2007, shortly preceding his retirement in 2009.  Pekarsky continued to teach in the MFA Program as professor emeritus and visiting professor until 2014.

Artistic style and development

Early years

Initially influenced by the Chicago figurative style, Pekarsky would transition from this "to the figure in landscape, to groups of figures in the landscape. The figure would later grow smaller and finally withdraw from the stage altogether, with the exception of the implicit presence of the viewer."

New York and public art

After moving back to New York in 1967, Pekarsky became involved with public art, specifically City Walls, Inc., an artist-directed nonprofit which he helped found in 1969.  Pekarsky painted five large-scale, public murals for City Walls between 1969 and 1974. The City Walls project would eventually evolve into New York's Public Art Fund.

In addition to the visibility that City Walls brought to his work, its scale, according to Gil Einstein – Director of G.W. Einstein Co., Inc., and his art dealer for almost thirty years – also  "forced him to simplify his imagery," after which "his paintings and drawings of formal gardens and landscapes became increasingly stylized."

While he was working on the public murals, these formal gardens – empty of humans though shaped by them – were being painted in the studio, and the artist's ideas about both the urban environment and our relationships to the earth were changing.

It was during this period that he became involved with environmental organizations and designed posters for the first Earth Day (April 22, 1970).

The Desert

By the mid-1970s, figures had already "walked off the picture plane ... left behind in the move" from Chicago back to New York.   In 1975 a "catalyst for more change" occurred in the form of a trip to the Mojave Desert, causing him to turn from the crafting of public, abstract "landscape symbols" to the "quiet private making" of what he termed "environmentally political" pieces. Pekarsky's work then became more explicitly "engaged in a moral imperative which – like it or not, I suppose – as artists today we're all engaged in."

Rather than containing human subjects, Pekarsky's paintings increasingly treat the viewer as the subject, and the canvas as a lens onto both a physical and psychic landscape.  As Donald Kuspit put it, "Pekarsky's desert landscapes are interior as well as exterior landscapes, subjective and objective at the same time, which is why they seem uncannily real rather than materially real."

In 1989, Pekarsky was invited to participate in "Painting Beyond the Death of Painting," the first group exhibition of contemporary American painting in the Soviet Union Since 1917, in which he showed recent large-scale work from this period.

The early 1990s saw a noticeable change in Pekarsky's style. Gil Einstein noted in 1995 that "the fine detail of the work of the 1980's has disappeared and been replaced by an expressionism which partially reflects the artist's earlier work. Where methodology was the invention before, imagery is the invention now.  Having shown us for many years what he saw, Pekarsky is now beginning to show us what he thinks."

Pekarsky's work throughout the 1990s and 2000s continued this trend.  Reviewing a 2009 retrospective of his work, Benjamin Genocchio wrote in The New York Times:

In a statement for the opening of an installation of his work in 2013, Pekarsky wrote:

Pekarsky continues to paint, curate, and teach in the MFA program as emeritus and visiting professor at Stony Brook University.

Exhibitions and collections

Selected one-man exhibitions
2017:  Small Things, Quiet Places, Gallery North – Setauket, NY (Oct 7 - Nov 3)
2013:  Installation at Simons Center for Geometry and Physics, Stony Brook University – Stony Brook, NY
2009: Endgame, at two venues: Anthony Giodano Gallery, Dowling College (Oakdale, NY) and Gallery North (Setauket, NY)
2009: Mel Pekarsky: Things In The Desert, Paintings, Drawings and Artist's Books, 1974–2009, University Art Gallery, Stony Brook University – Stony Brook, NY
2007: Etudes: Paintings, Prints, Drawings, Van Deb Editions – New York, NY
2002–03: Coming to the Desert, The Nielsen Gallery – Boston, MA
2001: Anxious Object: Paintings and Drawings from Two Decades by Mel Pekarsky, Nevada Museum of Art – Reno, NV
1977–1997: Eleven one-man exhibitions at G.W. Einstein Co. – New York, NY
1993: Intimate Spaces, The Museums at Stony Brook – Stony Brook, NY
1990: Mel Pekarsky,  Butler Institute of American Art – Youngstown, Ohio
1987: Marianne Deson Gallery – Chicago, IL
1984: Mel Pekarsky, Miami-Dade Community College – Miami, FL
1982: The Fine Arts Gallery, The Bank of America Headquarters Building – San Francisco, CA
1980: 112 Greene Street Gallery – New York, NY
1980: Centro Colombo-Americano – Bogota, Colombia
1974: Gimpel & Weitzenhoffer Gallery – New York, NY 
1966: The Devorah Sherman Gallery – Chicago, IL
1963, '65: The John L. Hunt Gallery – Chicago, IL
1961: The University of Chicago – Chicago, IL

Selected group exhibitions
2014: Summer Salon, Van Deb Editions – Long Island City, NY
2014: Identity of Place, installation, Omni Center – Uniondale, NY
2014:  Impressions, Gallery North – Setauket, NY
2013: Elementary with Nobuho Nagasawa and, Howardena Pindell, Gallery North – Setauket, NY
2013: Black + White, print editions with Chris Gianakos, Mimi Gross, Paul Resika,Arden Scott, Claire Seidl, and others, Van Deb Editions – New York, NY
2008: 183rd Annual Invitational Exhibition, National Academy of Design – New York, NY
2008: From Here to the Horizon: American Landscape Prints from Whistler to Celmins, Zimmerli Museum, Rutgers University – Rutgers, NJ
2006: Under Cover: Artists' Sketchbooks, The Fogg Museum of Art, Harvard University – Cambridge, MA 
2005: Trees, From Here to Eternity (Hopefully), Nielsen Gallery – Boston, MA
2003: Prints, Albright Knox Gallery – Buffalo, NY
2002: Grounded, landscape painting, Rosenberg + Kaufman Fine Art – New York, NY 
2001: American Academy of Arts and Letters Invitational Exhibition – New York, NY
2000: A Decade of Collecting: Recent Acquisitions of Prints and Drawings from 1940–2000, The Fogg Museum of Art, Harvard University – Cambridge, MA
1999: Art Santa Fe, small paintings
1978–1994: 18 group exhibitions at G.W. Einstein Co. – New York, NY 
1993: The Environmentalists; The Pleasures and Perils of Our Landscape, with Rackstraw Downes, Kay WalkingStick and others, Gallery North – Setauket, NY (also curator)
1991: Drawings, an exhibition of drawings by artists residing on Long Island, including works by Malcolm Morley, Leon Polk Smith, Larry Rivers, Alan Shields, others, Gallery North – Setauket, NY
1990: Landscapes on Paper, Graham Modern Gallery – New York, NY
1990: 165th Annual Exhibition, National Academy of Design – New York, NY
1989: Painting Beyond the Death of Painting, First Group Exhibition of American Art in the Soviet Union Since 1917, Kuznetsky Most Exhibition Hall – Moscow
1989: Transformative Vision: Contemporary American Landscape Painting, Three Rivers Arts Festival, The Carnegie Museum of Art – Pittsburgh, PA
1987: "Monumental Space Variations, curated by Donald Kuspit, One Penn Plaza – New York, NY
1984: An Overview of American Drawing:  The Last Twenty Years, Cleveland Museum of Art – Cleveland, OH
1983: NY Group Exhibition, Albright-Knox Gallery of Art – Buffalo, NY 
1982: Ten Years of Public Art, inaugural exhibition, The Doris C. Freedman Gallery of Public Art, The Urban Center – New York, NY 
1981: The American Landscape:  Recent Developments, The Whitney Museum of American Art – Stamford, CT branch
1980–81: Views Over America, traveling exhibition, The Museum of Modern Art Junior Council
1979: Works of Art in Public Places, The Cooper-Hewitt Museum of the Smithsonian Institution, Federal Hall of the Department of The Interior – New York, NY
1978: Contemporary Drawings:  Seven Artists, The Cleveland Museum of Art – Cleveland, OH
1978: Mural Art, USA, Musees Royeaux des Beaux-Arts de Belgique – Brussels, Belgium
1978: Fine Art Lithography From Solo Press, Nobe Gallery – New York, NY
1974: American Prints, The Brooklyn Museum – Brooklyn, NY
1973: American Landscape Painting, Gimpel & Weitzenhoffer Gallery – New York, NY
1972: Projects of City Walls, Lever House – New York, NY
1971: Oversize Prints, billboard on 23rd Street, The Whitney Museum of American Art – New York, NYAlso'':
Art Institute of Chicago – Chicago, IL
With the United States Information Agency – France and Germany, various cities
Exhibition Momentum – Chicago, IL
The Richard Gray Gallery – Chicago, IL
The University of Illinois – Chicago, IL
The Werbe Gallery – Detroit, MI
The Blue Parrot Gallery – New York, NY

Selected public and corporate collections
The Snite Museum of Art, Notre Dame University
The Museums at Ball State University
The Cleveland Museum of Art
The Fogg Museum of Art, Harvard University
The Nevada Museum of Art
The Corcoran Gallery of Art
United States Department of State
The Columbus, Ohio Museum of Art
The Minneapolis Institute of The Arts
The Yale University Museums
Leigh and Mary Block Gallery, Northwestern University
Simons Center for Geometry and Physics, Stony Brook University
The Indianapolis Museum of Art
The Weatherspoon Museum of Art, The University of North Carolina at Greensborough
The University of North Dakota
Marymount College
Kendall College
The Environmental Protection Agency
Zimmerli Museum, Print Archives, Rutgers University
Roswell, NM Museum of Art and Study Center
The Amerada Hess Corporation
American Express
American Electric Power Corporation
American Medical Association
AT&T Corporation
The Bank of America
The Chase Manhattan Bank
Fidelity Investments
The General Mills Corporation
The Heublein Corporation
The Prudential Corporation of America
Renaissance Technology
The Standard Oil Corporation
The Westinghouse Corporation

Notes

External links
Mel Pekarsky's Homepage
The Drawings of Jean-Francois Millet at Google Books
Art Criticism Vol. 7 No. 1, with transcript of Pekarsky's "Moral Imperative" panel

1934 births
American artists
Living people